Can Keles (born 2 September 2001) is an Austrian professional footballer who plays as a winger for Austria Wien.

Career
Keles is a youth product of Haidbrunn-Wacker, Wiener Neustädter, and Rapid Wien before joining Austria Wien's youth academy in 2013. He signed his first professional contract with the club on 21 August 2020, initially assigned to their reserves. He made his senior debut with Austria Wien in a 4–0 Austrian Cup win over Spittal on 17 July 2021. On 21 March 2022, he extended his contract with Austria Wien keeping him at the club until 2026.

International career
Born in Austria, Keles is of Turkish descent. He is a youth international for Austria, having represented the Austria U16s, U17s, and U18s. He was called up to the Austria 21s in March 2022.

References

External links
 
 OEFB Profile
 Bundesliga.AT profile

2001 births
Living people
Footballers from Vienna
Austrian footballers
Austria youth international footballers
Austrian people of Turkish descent
FK Austria Wien players
Austrian Football Bundesliga players
2. Liga (Austria) players
Austrian Regionalliga players
Association football wingers